Regions Center may refer to:
 Regions Center (Birmingham), a skyscraper in Birmingham, Alabama, USA
 Regions Center (Little Rock), a skyscraper in Little Rock, Arkansas, USA
 A skyscraper in Nashville, Tennessee, USA, now known as the UBS Tower (Nashville)